The following lists events that happened during 2012 in Kazakhstan.

Incumbents
President: Nursultan Nazarbayev
Prime Minister: Karim Massimov (until 24 September) Serik Akhmetov (from 24 September)

Events

July
 July 17 – The Syrian consulate in Almaty suffered serious damage following an alleged arson attack.

December
 December 25 – An Antonov An-72-100 plane crashed near Shymkent, killing all 27 people on board.

References

 
Years of the 21st century in Kazakhstan
2010s in Kazakhstan
Kazakhstan
Kazakhstan
Kazakhstan